John B. Podesto, nicknamed Presto Podesto from Modesto (March 26, 1921 – November 13, 2015) was an American football quarterback and halfback who played for the St. Mary's Gaels. He was drafted in the first round (10th overall) in the 1944 NFL Draft by the Pittsburgh Steelers but did not play for them. He later was signed by the Chicago Bears but did not play with them either.

Early life and education
Podesto was born on March 26, 1921 in Modesto, California to Giovannia and Maria Podesto. He was the youngest of nine children. He attended Modesto High School and Modesto Junior College before continuing his education at Saint Mary's University and College of the Pacific. He excelled at baseball and football while at Modesto, Saint Mary's, and College of the Pacific. He played quarterback and halfback when he was in football. In 1943, under coach Amos Alonzo Stagg, Podesto was named All-American while at Pacific. While playing from 1941 to 1943, and from 1944 to 1945, Podesto entered the Marine Corps and achieved the rank of captain while in World War II.

Professional career
Podesto was drafted with the 10th pick in the 1944 NFL Draft by the Pittsburgh Steelers. He was serving in the marines from 1944 to 1945 so he could not play with them. In 1946, he signed with the team. However, Podesto did not play with the Steelers. The next season he signed with the Chicago Bears but did not play with them, either.

Later life
After Podesto's sports career, he was a successful business owner. He worked with the Modesto Tallow Company for over 50 years. He died on November 13, 2015 at the age of 94. At the time of his death he had 5 children, 12 grandchildren, and 2 great-grandchildren.

References

External links
 

1921 births
2015 deaths
Saint Mary's Gaels football players
Sportspeople from Modesto, California
Saint Mary's Gaels baseball players
Pacific Tigers football players
Pacific Tigers baseball players
Players of American football from California